Clarence Bissell Blair Jr. is an American developmental psychologist and Professor of Cognitive Psychology in the Steinhardt School of Culture, Education, and Human Development at New York University. He previously taught at Pennsylvania State University for ten years. He is known for his research on the development of emotional self-regulation in children.

Selected publications
Blair, C. (2002). School readiness: Integrating cognition and emotion in a neurobiological conceptualization of child functioning at school entry. American Psychologist, 57, 111–127.
Blair, C. (2010). Stress and the development of self-regulation in context. Child Development Perspectives, 4, 181–188.
Blair, C. & Raver, C.C. (2012). Child development in the context of adversity: Experiential canalization of brain and behavior. American Psychologist, 67, 309–318.
Blair, C. (2016). Developmental science and executive function. Current Directions in Psychological Science, 25, 3–7.

References

External links
Faculty profile

Living people
21st-century American psychologists
American developmental psychologists
Steinhardt School of Culture, Education, and Human Development faculty
Pennsylvania State University faculty
McGill University alumni
University of Alabama at Birmingham alumni
Year of birth missing (living people)